Epactionotus itaimbezinho is a species of catfish in the family Loricariidae. It is native to South America, where it occurs in the Mampituba River basin. It reaches 3.8 cm (1.5 inches) SL.

References 

Otothyrinae
Taxa named by Roberto Esser dos Reis
Taxa named by Scott Allen Schaefer
Fish described in 1998
 Catfish of South America